Tyler Robertson (born December 23, 1987) is an American former professional baseball pitcher. He has played in Major League Baseball (MLB) for the Minnesota Twins.

Career

Minnesota Twins
The ,  left-hander was the Twins' third-round pick in the 2006 Major League Baseball draft. He made his major league debut on June 26, 2012, where Robertson struck out the first three batters he faced.

In the first half of the  season, Tyler went 4–2 with a 2.76 earned run average and 58 strike outs over 11 starts to help Fort Myers capture the Florida State League first-half West Division title. One of those wins was a complete game 6–1 victory over the Tampa Yankees at Steinbrenner Field.

He was pulled after four innings against the Vero Beach Devil Rays on July 7 with shoulder soreness, and did not pitch again for the rest of the season.

Robertson mainly throws three pitches — a four-seam fastball and two-seam fastball hovering around 90 mph, as well as a slider in the low-to-mid 80s. The slider is actually his most commonly thrown pitch against left-handed hitters, especially when he is ahead in the count. Robertson has also thrown a small handful of curveballs and changeups.

Washington Nationals
The Washington Nationals claimed Robertson off waivers on June 7, 2013. He was designated for assignment on November 20, 2013.

References

External links

Minor League Baseball

1987 births
Living people
Minnesota Twins players
Gulf Coast Twins players
Beloit Snappers players
Fort Myers Miracle players
New Britain Rock Cats players
Rochester Red Wings players
Syracuse Chiefs players
People from Simi Valley, California
Baseball players from California
Sportspeople from Ventura County, California